The Basenji  is a breed of hunting dog. It was bred from stock that originated in central Africa. The Fédération Cynologique Internationale places the breed in the Spitz and primitive types. The Basenji produces an unusual yodel-like sound, due to its unusually shaped larynx. This trait also gives the Basenji the nickname the 'barkless dog.'

Basenjis share many distinctive traits with pariah dog types. Basenjis come into estrus only once annually similar to dingoes, New Guinea singing dogs and Tibetan Mastiffs, when compared with other dog breeds which may have two or more breeding seasons each year. Basenji lack a distinctive odor, and are prone to howls, yodels, and other vocalizations over the characteristic bark of modern dog breeds. The breed's original foundation stock came from Congo.

Name 
In the Congo, the Basenji is also known as the "dog of the bush".

In Swahili, another Bantu language, from East Africa,  translates to "savage dog". Another local name is m'bwa m'kube, 'mbwa wa mwitu "wild dog", or "dog that jumps up and down", a reference to their tendency to jump straight up to spot their quarry.

Lineage 
The Basenji has been identified as a basal breed that predates the emergence of the modern breeds in the 19th century. DNA studies based on whole-genome sequences indicate that the basenji and the dingo are both considered to be basal members of the domestic dog clade.

In 2021, the genome of two basenjis were assembled, which indicated that the basenji fell within the Asian spitz group. The AMY2B gene produces an enzyme, amylase, that helps to digest starch. The wolf, the husky and the dingo possess only two copies of this gene, which provides evidence that they arose before the expansion of agriculture. The genomic study found that similarly, the basenji possesses only two copies of this gene.

History 

The Basenji originated on the continent of Africa. Europeans first described the breed in 1895 in the Congo. These local dogs, which Europeans identified as a distinct breed and called basenji, were prized by locals for their intelligence, courage, speed, and silence.

Several attempts were made to introduce the breed into England, but the earliest imports succumbed to disease. In 1923 six Basenjis were taken from Sudan, but all six died from distemper shots received in quarantine. It was not until the 1930s that foundation stock was successfully established in England, and then in the United States by animal importer Henry Trefflich. It is likely that nearly all the Basenjis in the Western world are descended from these few original imports. The breed was officially accepted into the AKC in 1943. In 1990, the AKC stud book was reopened to 14 new imports at the request of the Basenji Club of America. The stud book was reopened again to selected imported dogs from 1 January 2009 to 31 December 2013. An American-led expedition collected breeding stock in villages in the Basankusu area of the Democratic Republic of Congo, in 2010. Basenjis are also registered with the United Kennel Club.

The popularity of the Basenji in the United States, according to the American Kennel Club, has declined over the past decade, with the breed ranked 71st in 1999, decreasing to 84th in 2006, and to 93rd in 2011.

Characteristics

Appearance 

Basenjis are small, short-haired dogs with erect ears, tightly curled tails and graceful necks. A Basenji's forehead is wrinkled, even more so when it is young or extremely excited. A Basenji's eyes are typically almond-shaped. They are a square breed, which means they are as long as they are tall with males usually larger than females. Basenjis are athletic dogs, and deceptively powerful for their size.

They have a graceful, confident gait like a trotting horse, and skim the ground in a double suspension gallop, with their characteristic curled tail straightened out for greater balance when running at their top speed. Basenjis come in a few different colorations: red, black, tricolor, and brindle, and they all have white feet, chests and tail tips. They can also come in trindle, which is a tricolor with brindle points, a rare combination.

Temperament and behavior 
The Basenji is alert, energetic, curious and reserved with strangers. The Basenji tends to become emotionally attached to a single human. Basenjis may not get along with non-canine pets. Basenjis dislike wet weather, much like cats, and will often refuse to go outside in any sort of damp conditions. They like to climb, and can easily scale chain wire/link fences.

Basenjis often stand on their hind legs, somewhat like a meerkat, by themselves or leaning on something; this behavior is often observed when the dog is curious about something. Basenjis have a strong prey drive. According to the book The Intelligence of Dogs, they are the second least trainable dog, when required to do human commands (behind only the Afghan Hound). Their real intelligence manifests when they are required to actually solve problems for the sake of the dogs' own goals (such as food, or freedom).

Basenjis are highly prey driven and will go after cats and other small animals.

Health 
There is only one completed health survey of dog breeds, including the Basenji, that was conducted by the UK Kennel Club in 2004. The survey indicated the prevalence of diseases in Basenjis with dermatitis (9% of responses), incontinence and bladder infection (5%), hypothyroidism (4%), pyometra and infertility (4%).

Longevity 
Basenjis in the 2004 UK Kennel Club survey had a median lifespan of 13.6 years (sample size of 46 deceased dogs), which is 1–2 years longer than the median lifespan of other breeds of similar size. The oldest dog in the survey was 17.5 years. The most common causes of death were old age (30%), urologic (incontinence, Fanconi syndrome, chronic kidney failure 13%), behavior ("unspecified" and aggression 9%), and cancer (9%).

Fanconi syndrome 

Fanconi syndrome, an inheritable disorder in which the renal (kidney) tubes fail to reabsorb electrolytes and nutrients, is unusually common in Basenjis. Symptoms include excessive drinking, excessive urination, and glucose in the urine, which may lead to a misdiagnosis of diabetes. Fanconi syndrome usually presents between 4 and 8 years of age, but sometimes as early as 3 years or as late as 10 years. Fanconi syndrome is treatable and organ damage is reduced if treatment begins early. Basenji owners are advised to test their dog's urine for glucose once a month beginning at the age of 3 years. Glucose testing strips designed for human diabetics are inexpensive and available at most pharmacies. A Fanconi disease management protocol has been developed that can be used by veterinarians to treat Fanconi-afflicted dogs.
Beginning in 2011, the direct DNA Fanconi Test became available from the Orthopedic Foundation for Animals (OFA) and replaces the Fanconi Linked Marker Test.  The results from the test will indicate "Probably," "Clear/Normal," "Carrier," and "Affected" and will remain OFA website until the dogs are retested.  The DNA Fanconi Direct Test does not have an "Indeterminate" result, as this was only necessary in the Linked Marker Test, when the markers did not clearly indicate the status of the dog. Dogs with a "carrier" status may be safely bred only to mates with a "clear/normal" test result.

Other Basenji health issues 
Basenjis sometimes carry a simple recessive gene that, when homozygous for the defect, causes genetic hemolytic anemia. Most 21st-century Basenjis are descended from ancestors that have tested clean. When lineage from a fully tested line (set of ancestors) cannot be completely verified, the dog should be tested before breeding. As this is a non-invasive DNA test, a Basenji can be tested for HA at any time.

Basenjis sometimes suffer from hip dysplasia, resulting in loss of mobility and arthritis-like symptoms. All dogs should be tested by either OFA or PennHIP prior to breeding.

Malabsorption, or immunoproliferative enteropathy, is an autoimmune intestinal disease that leads to anorexia, chronic diarrhea, and even death. A special diet can improve the quality of life for afflicted dogs.

The breed can also fall victim to progressive retinal atrophy (a degeneration of the retina causing blindness) and several less serious hereditary eye problems such as coloboma (a hole in the eye structure), and persistent pupillary membrane (tiny threads across the pupil).

In popular culture 
 In Nyanga mythology, Rukuba was a talking Basenji and the pet of the fire god Nyamuriri. A man named either Nkhango or Mikhango convinced Rukuba to help him steal fire for his people. Angered by this, Nyamuriri sent his dog away. In some versions, he also takes the dog's ability to speak. In most versions, Rukuba is still able to speak when he goes to live with the Nyanga, but refuses to do so anymore once Nkhango tries to make him a messenger for the village.
 The title character of the 1954 novel Good-bye, My Lady, by James H. Street, is a Basenji (female). The book was made into a film of the same name in 1956, with a cast that included Brandon deWilde, Walter Brennan, and Sidney Poitier. Several Basenjis were used in the lead role, the main "star" being "My Lady of the Congo" a six-month-old Basenji bred by Veronica Tudor-Williams of Molesey, England. She was followed by four other young Basenjis to act as doubles including her sibling, "My Lord of the Congo", and "Flageolet of the Congo", (who would become an International Champion). "My Lady" did most of the scenes.
 The true story of a Basenji was featured in the episode "The Cat Came Back" on the radio program This American Life.
 According to the webcomic Achewood, if Jesus Christ were a dog, he would be a Basenji.
 Basenjis are featured in the fourth episode, "Tyler Tucker, I Presume?", of the third season of the animated television series The Wild Thornberrys. Nigel Thornberry encounters a group of tribesmen along with their Congolese hunting dogs. The series's director, Mark Risley, owns several Basenjis, and his dogs provided the recorded voices for their animated counterparts.
 An episode of Pound Puppies, "The Pups Who Loved Me", revolves around a Basenji secret agent character by the name of Bondo. The dog is drawn with an appropriate likeness, but appears to bark, which is uncharacteristic of the breed.
Basenjis are featured in the first part of The Apu Trilogy (India).
A Basenji dog is one of the main protagonists of the novel August Magic by Veronica Anne Starbuck.
Anubis, the barkless dog, is a Basenji dog featured in a horror movie Soulmate and Tales of Halloween. 
Yodels, Wails and Basenji Tails – the 1998 book that features a compilation of Basenji stories.
The Story of Tongdaeng by His Majesty King Bhumibol Adulyadej of Thailand features one of his pets Tongdaeng, the Basenji dog.
Ace Ventura: Pet Detective. New release of this film on video includes footage of a black and white Basenji, which was cut from the original release. This Basenji has also been featured on Australia's video cover.
The African Queen features a Basenji sitting on the lap of the native in the church scene at the beginning of the film.
Ring of Fire: An Indonesian Odyssey features a Basenji.
Mystic Fire Video contains the Borneo Basenji.
The Magic of Lassie – Basenji is seen during one of the scenes in the cab of an 18-wheeler in the parking lot.
The Constant Gardener features a Basenji puppy in the village, held by a child on a rope leash.
So Quiet on the Canine Front and Trader Hound, movie shorts of the Dogville Comedies series, contain trained dogs as actors, two of which are Basenjis.
Air Bud: World Pup – two Basenjis of different colors are seen running with the pack of dogs and chasing two crooks at the end of the film.
A Basenji is carried on Matthew Barney's head, in depiction of the Egyptian god of the dead Anubis, in his 2007 performance Guardian of the Veil.

See also
 Dogs portal
 List of dog breeds
 African village dog
 Indian pariah dog
 Pariah dog
 New Guinea singing dog

References

External links 

 

FCI breeds
Dog breeds originating in Africa
Dog breeds originating in the Democratic Republic of the Congo
Rare dog breeds